The 1994 Humboldt State Lumberjacks football team represented Humboldt State University during the 1994 NCAA Division II football season. Humboldt State competed in the Northern California Athletic Conference in 1994.

The 1994 Lumberjacks were led by fourth-year head coach Fred Whitmire. They played home games at the Redwood Bowl in Arcata, California. Humboldt State finished the season as co-champions of the NCAC, with a record of eight wins and two losses (8–2, 2–1 NCAC). The Lumberjacks outscored their opponents 269–173 for the season.

Schedule

Notes

References

Humboldt State
Humboldt State Lumberjacks football seasons
Northern California Athletic Conference football champion seasons
Humboldt State Lumberjacks football